Leucine-rich repeat and calponin homology domain-containing protein 4 is a protein that in humans is encoded by the LRCH4 gene.

This gene encodes a protein that contains leucine-rich repeats (LRR) at its amino terminus and that is known to be involved in ligand binding. The carboxyl terminus may act as a membrane anchor. Identified structural elements suggest that the encoded protein resembles a receptor.

References

Further reading